The 1932–33 La Liga season began on 27 November 1932 and finished on 28 March 1933. Holders Madrid FC retained their title.

Betis became the first club from Andalusia to compete in La Liga during this season.

Team information

League table

Results

Pichichi Trophy and La liga top scorers
Note: this season there are no differences between La liga top scorers and the Pichichi Trophy winners.

References
La Liga top scorers 1932–33

External links
LFP website

La Liga seasons
1932–33 in Spanish football leagues
Spain